The National Poetry Series is an American literary awards program.

Every year since 1979, the National Poetry Series has sponsored the publication of five books of poetry. Manuscripts are solicited through an annual open competition, judged and chosen by poets of national stature, and issued by various publishers. Past judges of this prestigious series include Louise Glück (12th Poet Laureate of the United States), Tracy K. Smith (22nd Poet Laureate of the United States), Ada Limón (24th Poet Laureate of the United States), and Richard Blanco (United States inaugural poet).

The National Poetry Series has also created the Paz Prize for Poetry, named in honor of Nobel Prize-winning poet, Octavio Paz; this award recognizes a previously unpublished poetry book written in Spanish by a distinguished poet residing in the U.S. This award is highly recognized as one of the most important prizes in Spanish languages in the United States. Past winners of this prize include Dinapiera Di Donato by Colaterales/Collateral in 2012 and Cuban-American Carlos Pintado for his Nueve monedas/Nine coins in 2014.

Winners
Each year links to its corresponding "[year] in poetry" article:

See also
American poetry
List of poetry awards
List of literary awards
List of years in poetry
List of years in literature

External links
 National Poetry Series Previous Winners
 Winners of the 2009 Open Competition
 Background of the National Poetry Series

American poetry awards
Awards established in 1979
1979 establishments in the United States